A list of the films produced in the Cinema of Mexico ordered by year of release in the 1930s. For an alphabetical list of articles on Mexican films see :Category:Mexican films.

1930s

External links
 Mexican film at the Internet Movie Database

1930s
Lists of 1930s films
Films

fr:Liste de films mexicains
zh:墨西哥電影列表